Claire Lalouette is a French Egyptologist, former scientific member of the Institut Français d'Archéologie Orientale and Professor at Paris-Sorbonne University.

Bibliography 
 Fidèles du soleil, à propos de la statuette du musée de Brooklyn, 37, 48 E, Faculté des lettres et sciences humaines, Paris, 1963.
 La Littérature égyptienne, n°1934, coll. Que sais-je ?, PUF, Paris, 1981.
 Textes sacrés et textes profanes de l'ancienne Égypte. Tome 1 : Des pharaons et des hommes, préface de Pierre Grimal, Gallimard, Paris, 1984 
 Histoire de la civilisation pharaonique. Tome 1 : Au royaume d'Égypte. Le temps des rois-dieux, Fayard, Paris, 1991 ; réédition Flammarion, 1995 
 Histoire de la civilisation pharaonique. Tome 2 : Thèbes, ou la naissance d'un empire, Fayard, Paris, 1986 ; réédition Flammarion, 1995 
 Histoire de la civilisation pharaonique. Tome 3 : L’Empire des Ramsès, Fayard, Paris, 1985 ; réédition Flammarion, 1995 
 Textes sacrés et textes profanes de l'ancienne Égypte. Tome 2: Mythes, contes et poésie, Gallimard, Paris, 1987 
 L'Art de la vie dans l'Égypte pharaonique, Fayard, Paris, 1992 
 Mémoires de Ramsès le Grand, Éditions de Fallois, Paris, 1993 
 Contes et récits de l'Égypte ancienne, Flammarion, Paris, 1995.
 L'Art figuratif de l'Égypte pharaonique, Flammarion, Paris, 1996 
 Les Hommes illustres du temps des pharaons, Flammarion, Paris, 1996 
 Mémoires de Thutmose III, Calmann-Lévy, Paris, 1997 
 La Littérature égyptienne, PUF, Paris, 1997 
 Sagesse sémitique. De l'Égypte ancienne à l'Islam, Albin Michel, Paris, 1998 
 Le Monde des Ramsès, Bayard, Paris, 2002 
 Contes et récits de l'Égypte ancienne, Flammarion, Paris, 2003 
 Dieux et pharaons de l'Égypte ancienne, J'ai lu, 2004

References 

French Egyptologists
French women archaeologists
French women historians
20th-century French women writers
21st-century French women writers
Members of the Institut Français d'Archéologie Orientale